The Statistical Office of the Republic of Slovenia (SURS) (Slovene: Statistični urad Republike Slovenije, SURS) is an independent Slovenian state institution in charge of official statistical surveying. It reports directly to the prime minister of Slovenia. One of the office's activities is a nationwide census every 10 years, the last one being conducted in 2011. The office is located at Litostrojska cesta 54 (54 Litostroj Street) in Ljubljana. As of August 2019, its director is Bojan Nastav.

Directors

 Alojz Dular (1944–1945)
 Silva Exel Škerlak (1945–1948)
 Boris Debevec (1948–1951)
 Vojko Konvalinka (1951–1954)
 Rajko Kiauta (1954–1967)
 Franta Komel (1967–1981)
 Tomaž Banovec (1981–2003)
 Irena Križman (2003–2013)
 Genovefa Ružić (2013–2019)
 Bojan Nastav (2019–)

References

External links
Official website

Slovenia
Government of Slovenia
Organizations based in Slovenia